The Santa Fe International Film Festival (SFiFF), formerly known as the Santa Fe Independent Film Festival, is an American film festival held annually in Santa Fe, New Mexico at the Lensic Performing Arts Center, Violet Crown Cinema, Center for Contemporary Arts, The Screen, and George R.R. Martin's Jean Cocteau Cinema.

History 
The SFiFF began in 2009.

Honorees at SFiFF 2012 included Chris Eyre, Rudolfo Anaya, and Judy Blume.

In 2013, SFiFF was included in MovieMaker magazine's list of "25 Coolest General Film Festivals on the Planet". 2013 Santa Fe Independent Film Festival awarded John Waters & actor Wes Studi. John Waters performed his live one-man show This Filthy World at the Lensic Performing Arts Center.

For SFiFF 2014 there were over 10,000 attendees for the first time, and presented Lifetime Achievement Awards to Shirley MacLaine and George R. R. Martin.

In 2015, Santa Fe Independent Film Festival honored Ted Hope, Imogene Hughes, and Hampton Sides.

SFiFF 2015 honored Gena Rowlands with a lifetime achievement award.

SFiFF 2016 presented Jacqueline Bisset with the Lifetime Achievement Award, and Jay Roach with the American filmmaker award.

SFiFF 2017 presented John Sayles and Maggie Renzi with the Lifetime Achievement Award. N. Scott Momaday was presented the Lifetime Achievement Award by Robert Redford and John Waters. Chris Eyre, George R.R. Martin, and Wes Studi returned as guests. SFiFF presented a Q&A with Ethan Hawke at Center for Contemporary Arts.

SFiFF 2018 presented Bill Plympton with a Lifetime Achievement Award, and Alexandria Bombach received the festival's Visionary Award for Santa Fe Independent Film Festival's 10th Annual Festival.

In 2019, SFiFF was included in Moviemaker magazine's list of "50 Festivals Worth the Entry Fee". SFiFF also presented Lifetime Achievement Awards to Tantoo Cardinal and Jane Seymour.

In 2021, SFiFF presented the Lifetime Achievement Award to Director Oliver Stone. https://www.abqjournal.com/2426699/santa-fe-independent-film-fest-to-honor-oliver-stone.html

In 2022, SFiFF presented the Lifetime Achievement Award to Godfrey Reggio and presented the world premier of his newest film Once Within A Time.
 
SFiFF also presented Director Catherine Hardwicke with the Visionary Award. 

In July 2022, the festival was rebranded as the Santa Fe International Film Festival.

Notable films 

Salt of the Earth, (2010}Hostiles Only The BraveFire at SeaShopliftersBurningThe SquareOn Her ShouldersBless Me, UltimaThe Broken Circle Breakdown
The HomesmanTaped'', an original by Diederik van Rooijen, of whom Columbia Pictures bought the rights for an American remake.
Girlhood
The Front Runner
 Women Talking

References

External links

Culture of Santa Fe, New Mexico
Film festivals in New Mexico